Collusion is an agreement, usually secretive, which occurs between two or more persons to deceive, mislead, or defraud others of legal rights. If the agreement is to commit a crime in the future, such collusion is considered a criminal conspiracy. It usually requires an agreement to coordinate actions that could lead to the crime. (See Mueller special counsel investigation#Conspiracy vs collusion)

Collusion may also refer to:

Collusion (EP), a 2005 metalcore album
Collusion Syndicate, a defunct special interest group
Collusion (software), later called Lightbeam, an experimental add-on for Firefox and Google Chrome

See also
Collision (disambiguation)